Francesco Fantin was an Italian anti-fascist activist who emigrated to Australia in 1924 and found work in Queensland as a cane cutter. He remained politically active as an anti-fascist organiser and fundraiser. In 1942 he was placed in a World War II internment camp where he was killed under suspicious circumstances. His killer, Giovanni Casotti, was ultimately convicted of manslaughter, but stood informally accused of murder by Communists who considered Fantin an ally, and an enemy of both Mussolini and Hitler. His death became the subject of a bilingual play written by Teresa Crea, entitled Red Like the Devil. It was performed in 1991 by Adelaide-based theatre company, Doppio Teatro. Performances were staged at Loveday, near Barmera, where Fantin was interned and died.

References 

Italian anti-fascists
1942 deaths
Italian emigrants to Australia
1942 murders in Australia
People murdered in South Australia
Date of birth missing
Place of birth missing
Sugar industry in Australia
1940s in South Australia
Murder in South Australia